Out of Payne Comes Love was Freda Payne's sixth American released album, released in 1975. All of the tracks except for "Million Dollar Horse" would be later issued on the collection Lost in Love.

Track listing

Personnel
Produced by: Bob Monaco
Recorded and mixed at: ABC Recording Studios, Inc.
Engineered by: Howard Gale
Mastered at: ABC Recording Studios, Inc.
Mastering engineer: Phil Cross
Special thanks to: Howard Gale, Ron Stockert, Gary Monaco, Jimmy Benso, John Klemmer and Cyrano, Los Angeles for cover location
Wardrobe courtesy of: Holly's Harp, Los Angeles
Album design by: Earl R. Klasky
Photography by: Antonin Kratochvil

Musicians
"Look What I Found"
Ron Stockert: Strings and horns arrangements
Dennis Belfield: Bass
Mickey McMeel: Drums
Ron Stockert: Fender rhodes, piano
Ben Benay: Electric guitar
Jimmy Benso: Electric guitar solo
Gavin Christopher: Percussion
Brooks Hunnicutt, Tish Coulter, Lisa Freeman Roberts: Background vocals
"I Hear Rumors"
Jimmie Haskell: Strings arrangements
Scott Edwards: Bass
Ollie Brown: Drums
Ben Benay: Acoustic and electric guitar
Ron Stockert: Fender rhodes, piano
Jimmy Benso: Electric guitar
Gavin Christopher: Percussion
Tish Coulter, Lisa Freeman Roberts, Maxine Willard: Background vocals
"You"
Jimmie Haskell: Strings arrangements
Dennis Belfield: Bass
Mickey McMeel: Drums
Ben Benay: Guitar solo
Jimmy Benso: Rhythm guitar
Ron Stockert: Piano, moog, organ
Gary Monaco: Percussion
Lisa Freeman Roberts, Tish Coulter, Maxine Willard, Jay Gruska: Background vocals
"Keep It Coming"
Ron Stockert: Horns arrangements, clavinet, piano, fender rhodes, organ
Dennis Belfield: Bass
Mickey McMeel: Drums
Ben Benay: Electric guitar
Brooks Hunnicutt, Tish Coulter, Lisa Freeman Roberts: Background vocals
"Seems So Long"
Johnny Bond: String bass
Ollie Brown: Drums
Ben Benay: Electric guitar, acoustic guitar
Ron Stockert: Organ, string ensemble, fender rhodes
Vic Feldman: Vibes
Gavin Christopher: Percussion
"You Brought the Woman out of Me"
Ron Stockert: Strings arrangements
Scott Edwards: Bass
Ollie Brown: Drums
Ron Stockert: Arp odyssey, clavinet, moog, organ
Ben Benay: Electric rhythm guitar
Jimmy Benso: Guitar solo, percussion
Gavin Christopher: Percussion
Tish Coulter, Brooks Hunnicutt, Lisa Freeman Roberts: Background vocals
"(See Me) One Last Time"
Jimmie Haskell: Strings arrangements
Dennis Belfield: Bass
Mickey McMeel: Drums
Ben Benay: Acoustic guitar
Ron Stockert: Piano
"Lost in Love"
Dennis Belfield: Bass
Mickey McMeel: Drums
Ben Benay: Electric and acoustic guitar
Ron Stockert: Fender rhodes
John Klemmer: Saxophone solo
Vic Feldman: Vibes, flapamba
Gavin Christopher and Jimmy Benso: Percussion
"Million Dollar Horse"
Ben Benay: Horns arrangements, electric guitar
Jimmie Haskell: Strings arrangements
Scott Edwards: Bass
Ollie Brown: Drums
Ron Stockert: Fender rhodes, organ, piano, clavinet
Jimmy Benso: Electric guitar effects
Gary Monaco: Percussion
Gavin Christopher: Congas
Tish Coulter, Maxine Willard, Lisa Freeman Roberts, Jay Gruska: Background vocals
The Kids: Kim, Scott, Renée

1975 albums
ABC Records albums
Albums arranged by Jimmie Haskell
Freda Payne albums